Cambodia is the smallest of the three Francophone communities in Southeast Asia, the others being found in Vietnam and Laos. Out of all Asian Francophone nations, Cambodia is where French has declined the most.  In 2014, French was spoken by  people as a foreign language, which is 3% of the country's population and by only 873 people as a mother tongue according to the country's 2008 census.

History

The French language began its presence in Cambodia in the late 19th century after French explorers and merchants made their way from Vietnam into Cambodia. In 1863, Cambodia became a protectorate of France and was incorporated into French Indochina in 1887. The French did not exert much influence on Cambodia as they did in Vietnam and Khmer still remained widely taught and spoken in Cambodia as French was only limited to politicians. It was not until the 1890s that French began to be introduced in Cambodian education, but that was only limited to elite classes and it was only until the 1910s that the masses began learning French nationwide. With the growth of revolutionary movements in Vietnam, the French did not promote education in Cambodia and literacy rates remained low. The French language's growth in Cambodia only slightly increased until the Japanese invasion of Cambodia in World War II. Under the Japanese, Khmer was also made a government language alongside French and the two were taught alongside in schools. After the war, French again became the sole official language. When Cambodia became independent in 1953, the French language continued to be widely taught and used in the government.

Despite its strong presence in the government and education, French declined earlier and heavier in Cambodia than in Vietnam and Laos. Lower rates of influence and education in Cambodia meant that by the 1960s, French began to decline in Cambodia in contrast to being a government language in South Vietnam and Laos. In the mid-1970s, the Khmer Rouge came into power in Cambodia and began killing thousands of educated Cambodians, most of whom were French-educated. By the end of their reign in 1979, French had almost been completely wiped out in Cambodia. A Vietnamese invasion of Cambodia that established the People's Republic of Kampuchea reintroduced French into the nation, though ironically, French began its decline in Vietnam around this time. French continued to gain ground in Cambodia until 1993, when the present government of Cambodia took power and Khmer became the sole language of government and primary language of education. Beginning in the late 1990s, the English language became more widely taught in Cambodia and French continued its decline as English was seen as a more useful international language. Revival of the French language has gained ground much later in Cambodia than in Vietnam and Laos. In 1997, a French-language center opened in Phnom Penh and French-language education began to revive in Cambodia and dozens of Cambodian students study abroad each year in France. French is also once again, a diplomatic language of Cambodia. Communities of returned refugees from France and Quebec as well as students who have studied in Francophone nations have also added to the French-speaking population of Cambodia.

Dialect characteristics

Cambodian French vocabulary has been influenced by Cambodian, Cantonese Chinese, and Teochew Chinese. Cambodian French is based on standard Parisian French but contains more differences from standard French than the dialects of Vietnam and Laos.

Media
French-language media is present in Cambodia, though less so than in Vietnam and Laos. The nation boasts a French-language newspaper, Cambodge Nouveau (and had another, Cambodge Soir, until 2010), as well as French-language television channels.

Education
The following higher education institutions are members of the Agence Universitaire de la Francophonie:
Institut de Technologie du Cambodge
National Institute of Education 
Royal University of Agriculture
Royal University of Fine Arts 
Royal University of Law and Economics
Royal University of Phnom Penh

See also

French language in Vietnam
French language in Laos
Francophonie

References

Cambodia
Languages of Cambodia
French dialects
Languages attested from the 19th century